Christopher Geertsen (born 24 January 1993) is a Danish footballer who currently plays as a midfielder for Brabrand IF.

References 

Living people
1993 births
Danish men's footballers
Randers FC players
FC Fredericia players
Brabrand IF players
Association football midfielders
People from Randers
Sportspeople from the Central Denmark Region